The Israel national under-18 football team represents Israel in international football at youth level and is controlled by Israel Football Association, the governing body for football in Israel.

The current coach is Eli Ohana.

UEFA European U-18 Championship

*Draws include knockout matches decided on penalty kicks. 
**Gold background color indicates that the tournament was won. ***Red border color indicates tournament was held on home soil.

Current squad
Caps as of 14 October 2013.

See also 

 UEFA European Under-18 Football Championship
 Israel national football team
 Israel national under-21 football team
 Israel national under-19 football team
 Israel national under-17 football team
 Israel national under-16 football team

External links
 Israel Football Association website

F
Youth football in Israel
European national under-18 association football teams